The members of the 43rd General Assembly of Newfoundland were elected in the Newfoundland general election held in February 1996. The general assembly sat from March 20, 1996 to January 18, 1999.

The Liberal Party led by Brian Tobin formed the government.

Lloyd Snow served as speaker.

There were three sessions of the 43rd General Assembly:

Frederick Russell served as lieutenant governor of Newfoundland until 1997. Arthur Maxwell House succeeded Russell as lieutenant-governor.

Members of the Assembly 
The following members were elected to the assembly in 1996:

Notes:

By-elections 
By-elections were held to replace members for various reasons:

Notes:

References 

Terms of the General Assembly of Newfoundland and Labrador